The 2010 Pacific Nations Cup was a rugby union tournament held between four national sides on the Pacific Rim: Fiji, Japan, Samoa and Tonga. The competition was won by Samoa.

The Junior All Blacks, the defending title holder, decided not to take part in this year's competition. The inaugural competition was held in 2006. This year the tournament began on June 12 and ended on June 26, 2010, with most of the matches hosted by Samoa. All matches except for a match between Fiji and Asian 5 Nations champion, Japan were played at Apia Park in Samoa.

The tournament was a round-robin where each team played all of the other teams once. The standard bonus points system was used to determine the overall winner—four points for a win, two for a draw and none for a defeat, plus single bonus points offered for scoring four or more tries in a match and losing by 7 points or fewer.

Table

Schedule

Round 1

Round 2

 Hirotoki Onozawa became the 12th player in history to score his 40th Test try.

Round 3

Top scorers

Top points scorers

Source: irb.com

Top try scorers

Source: irb.com

See also 

2010 IRB Nations Cup

References

External links
 IRB Pacific Nations Cup – from the IRB website (June 12, 2010)
  Schedule – IRB website (pdf)
Samoa to host ANZ Pacific Nations Cup 2010  – IRB website, 11 March 2010

2010
2010 rugby union tournaments for national teams
2010 in Oceanian rugby union
2010 in Fijian rugby union
2009–10 in Japanese rugby union
2010 in Samoan rugby union
2010 in Tongan rugby union